State elections were held in South Australia on 26 March 1927. All 46 seats in the South Australian House of Assembly were up for election. The incumbent Australian Labor Party government led by Premier of South Australia Lionel Hill was defeated by the opposition Liberal Federation led by Leader of the Opposition Richard L. Butler, and the Country Party (SA) led by Archie Cameron. Each district elected multiple members, with voters casting multiple votes.

Before the election, the Liberal Federation attempted to enter in to a formal coalition with the Country Party, but when this was rejected, Country
Party candidates were given no Liberal opposition in six seats in five rural electorates.

Results

|}

See also
Results of the South Australian state election, 1927 (House of Assembly)
Candidates of the South Australian state election, 1927
Members of the South Australian House of Assembly, 1927–1930
Members of the South Australian Legislative Council, 1927–1930

References
State and federal election results in Australia since 1890

Elections in South Australia
1927 elections in Australia
1920s in South Australia
March 1927 events